Zavozhik is a rural locality (a village) in Dobryansky District, Perm Krai, Russia. The population was 80 as of 2010. There are 8 streets.

Geography 
Zavozhik is located 8 km north of Dobryanka (the district's administrative centre) by road. Dobryanka is the nearest rural locality.

References 

Rural localities in Dobryansky District